Gymnoscelis boninensis is a moth in the family Geometridae. It is found in Japan.

References

Moths described in 1994
Gymnoscelis
Moths of Japan